San Lorenzo High School, also known as "SLz", is a public high school located in Ashland, California, and is part of the San Lorenzo Unified School District.

The school's student body reflects the diversity of its surrounding and nearby communities, namely San Lorenzo, San Leandro, Hayward, and Oakland.  As of the 2018-2019 school year, the student demographics are, Hispanic-Latino (62%), followed by Asian (15%), Black (14%), non-Hispanic White (5%), Pacific Islander (2%), American Indian or Alaska Native (less than 1%), and two or more races (2%).

Academics
San Lorenzo High School includes three academies in partnership with the California Partnership Academies program:
Green Engineering and Technology (GREEN) - for students interested in careers in engineering, technology or other ecological or green industries.
Law Leadership and Culture (LLC) - for students interested in the law, in how societies and language develop and change over time, and about how students impact the world in a positive way.
Bay Area Digital Arts (BADA) - an academy which covers all the regular subjects while teaching skills in digital arts. Students participate in various visual/performing arts classes and their learning is enhanced through creativity.

San Lorenzo students are also able to enroll in Advanced Placement and Honors courses such as AP Government, AP Calculus, AP US History, and AP English.

Notable alumni
Pauline Russo Cutter, Mayor of San Leandro, California
Manny Fernandez, former NFL defensive tackle. Two-time Super Bowl champion with the Miami Dolphins
Nonito Donaire, boxer, former World Bantamweight Champion
John Ralston, College Football Hall of Fame Football Head Coach
Steve Smith, singer
Jerry Smith, former NFL tight end. Two-time Pro Bowl selection with the Washington Redskins

References

External links 
 San Lorenzo High School Homepage
 San Lorenzo Unified School District Homepage
 "Bay Area isn’t above the Confederacy fray: High school scrubs Rebel mascot" San Francisco Chronicle

High schools in Alameda County, California
Educational institutions established in 1950
Public high schools in California
1950 establishments in California